Mikael Johan Bernhard Käld (born 6 May 1954) is a Finnish football manager who most recently worked at Kokkola F10 in the Finnish women's premier division Kansallainen Liiga. Käld was the head coach of Finland women's national football team from 2001 to 2009.

Käld spent his own player career in the Finnish lower divisions. His debut as a women's manager Käld made in 2000 by coaching Jakobstad in Naisten Liiga (renamed Kansallainen Liiga in 2020). A year later he was named as the head coach of Finland women's team. Käld coached Finland in 2005 and 2009 UEFA Women's Championship. In 2005, Finland reached the semi-finals and 2009 the quarter-finals.

Michael Käld was nominated the Finnish Football Manager of the Year in 2004 and 2005.

References 

1954 births
Swedish-speaking Finns
People from Kronoby
Finnish footballers
Finnish football managers
Living people
Finland women's national football team managers
Association footballers not categorized by position
Sportspeople from Ostrobothnia (region)